The 1986 NCAA Division I men's ice hockey tournament was the culmination of the 1985–86 NCAA Division I men's ice hockey season, the 39th such tournament in NCAA history. It was held between March 21 and 29, 1986, and concluded with Michigan State defeating Harvard 6-5. All Quarterfinals matchups were held at home team venues while all succeeding games were played at the Providence Civic Center in Providence, Rhode Island.

Qualifying teams
The NCAA permitted 8 teams to qualify for the tournament and divided its qualifiers into two regions (East and West). Each of the tournament champions from the four Division I conferences (CCHA, ECAC, Hockey East and WCHA) received automatic invitations into the tournament with At-large bids making up the remaining 4 teams, 1 from each conference.

Format
The tournament featured three rounds of play. The two odd-number ranked teams from one region were placed into a bracket with the two even-number ranked teams of the other region. The teams were then seeded according to their ranking. In the Quarterfinals the first and fourth seeds and the second and third seeds played two-game aggregate series to determine which school advanced to the Semifinals. Beginning with the Semifinals all games were played at the Providence Civic Center and all series became Single-game eliminations. The winning teams in the semifinals advanced to the National Championship Game with the losers playing in a Third Place game.

Tournament bracket

Note: * denotes overtime period(s)

Quarterfinals

(E1) Boston University vs. (W4) Minnesota

(E2) Harvard vs. (W3) Western Michigan

(W1) Denver vs. (E4) Cornell

(W2) Michigan State vs. (E3) Boston College

Semifinal

(W2) Michigan State vs. (W4) Minnesota

(W1) Denver vs. (E2) Harvard

Third-place game

(W1) Denver vs. (W4) Minnesota

National Championship

(W2) Michigan State vs. (E2) Harvard

All-Tournament team
G: Norm Foster (Michigan State)
D: Mark Benning (Harvard)
D: Don McSween (Michigan State)
F: Allen Bourbeau (Harvard)
F: Mike Donnelly* (Michigan State)
F: Jeff Parker (Michigan State)
* Most Outstanding Player(s)

Quick facts
 The total championship attendance was 57,826
 Lane MacDonald (4 G, 7 A) of Harvard and Mitch Messier (5 G, 6 A) of Michigan St each tallied 11 points in the tournament, most by any players
 The following records were set or tied:
 Most Assists, Individual, Game – 5, Kevin Miller, Michigan St, first round, game 1, tied
 Shots on Goal, Both Teams, Period – 40, Minnesota (23) vs Michigan St (17), semifinals, second period, 5 goals

References

Tournament
NCAA Division I men's ice hockey tournament
NCAA Division I Men's Ice Hockey Tournament
NCAA Division I Men's Ice Hockey Tournament
NCAA Division I Men's Ice Hockey Tournament
NCAA Division I Men's Ice Hockey Tournament
NCAA Division I Men's Ice Hockey Tournament
NCAA Division I Men's Ice Hockey Tournament
1980s in Denver
Ice hockey competitions in Providence, Rhode Island
Ice hockey competitions in Boston
Ice hockey competitions in Denver
Ice hockey competitions in Michigan
Sports competitions in East Lansing, Michigan